Alcides Báez (born 17 January 1947) is a Paraguayan footballer. He played in 16 matches for the Paraguay national football team from 1971 to 1979. He was also part of Paraguay's squad for the 1979 Copa América tournament.

References

External links
 

1947 births
Living people
Paraguayan footballers
Paraguay international footballers
Place of birth missing (living people)
Association football goalkeepers